The Panasonic Lumix DMC-G3 is a digital mirrorless interchangeable lens camera adhering to the joint Olympus and Panasonic Micro Four Thirds System (MFT) system design standard.  The Panasonic Lumix DMC-G3 is the eighth Panasonic MFT camera introduced under the standard and the thirteenth model MFT camera introduced by either Olympus or Panasonic, as of the G3 product announcement date.

The G3 includes full HD video recording capability in AVCHD format in accordance with the MFT system design standard. The G3 is not the successor to the Panasonic Lumix DMC-G2 but is sold alongside it, placing the G2 in the entry-level position that the now-discontinued G10 once occupied. The G series cameras are designed primarily for users interested in still photography, with the more expensive GH series geared towards users who are interested in greater video functionality. Significantly, the G3 design departs from previous G-series designs with a smaller size, new sensor design and increased processing power.

Physically, the G3 approximates the size of the small Panasonic Lumix DMC-GF2, but includes an electronic viewfinder (EVF) and an articulated, touch control-enabled LCD panel. This made the G3, upon its introduction, the smallest available MFT camera with a built-in EVF, 25% smaller than the G2. The G3's smaller physical size limits the space available for manual control buttons and dials, with many functions now controllable through the articulated  LCD touch panel on the camera back.

The G3 has a 16.7 megapixel sensor derived from the one in the top-of-the-line Panasonic Lumix DMC-GH2.  This is an improvement over the previous 12.1 megapixel four thirds sensors used by other Olympus and Panasonic MFT cameras, with the exception of the unique multi-aspect sensors used on the Panasonic Lumix DMC-GH1 and GH2 hybrid video/still MFT cameras.

The G3 has faster Auto focus speed than most previous Panasonic MFT cameras. Panasonic claims that it possesses a revised JPEG engine which reputedly renders more pleasing colours (e.g., skin tones), with higher image quality and lower noise at higher ISO than any of the previous Panasonic cameras, with the possible exception of the GH2. However, some reviewers have criticised the quality of the G3s JPEG files.

At the center top of the G3 there are weak built-in pop up flash with GN10.5 at ISO160 (GN8.3 at ISO100), hot shoe and stereo microphone (G2 still monoaural). The G3 lacks the external microphone input that the older G2 does.

The G3 was announced in May 2011, and started shipping in June 2011. Available colors, depending on market, were black, chocolate brown, red and white. In the United States, the suggested MSRP for the camera and 14-42mm kit lens was US$700.00 and GBP628.99 in the United Kingdom

Micro four thirds system 
The Micro Four Thirds (MFT) system design standard was jointly announced in 2008 by Olympus and Panasonic, as a further evolution of the similarly named predecessor Four Thirds System pioneered by Olympus.  The Micro Four Thirds system standard uses the same sized sensor as the original Four Thirds system, which is half the size of a 35mm camera sensor. One advantage of the smaller sensor is smaller and lighter lenses, but one disadvantage is lower image quality.  For example, a typical Olympus MFT M.Zuiko 14-42mm f/3.5-5.6 kit lens weighs 112g, is 56mm in diameter and 50mm in length.  The equivalent Canon APS-C DSLR EF-S 18-55mm f3.5-5.6 kit lens weighs 190g, and is 69mm in diameter and 80mm in length In 35mm camera format the Micro Four Thirds system sensor has a 2× magnification factor on its lenses whereas the APS-C sized sensor cameras have 1.6× magnification factor.

While the older Four Thirds system design standard allowed the incorporation of a single lens reflex (SLR) camera design including a mirror box and pentaprism based optical viewfinder system, the MFT system design standard sought to pursue a technically different camera, and specifically slimmed down the key physical specifications which eliminated the ability to include the traditional complex optical path and the bulky mirror box needed for a SLR optical viewfinder.  Instead, MFT uses either a built-in (Panasonic) or optional (Olympus/Panasonic) compact electronic viewfinder (EVF) and/or LCD back panel displaying a Live view from the main image sensor.  Use of an EVF/back panel LCD and smaller four thirds image sensor format and allows for smaller and lighter camera bodies and lenses.  The MFT system offers better video recording functionality than traditional DSLRs.

MFT cameras are physically slimmer than most interchangeable lens cameras because the standard specifies a much reduced lens mount flange to imaging sensor plane distance of 20mm.  Typically this so-called flange focal distance is over 40mm on most interchangeable lens cameras. The MFT system design flange focal length distance allows for, through use of an adapter, the possibility to mount virtually any manufacturer's existing and legacy still camera interchangeable lens (as well as some video and cine lenses) to an MFT body, albeit using manual focus and manual aperture control.  For example, many theoretically obsolete 35mm film camera lenses, as well as existing current lenses for APS-C and full frame DSLR's are now usable on MFT cameras.

Firmware 

Panasonic has announced the following firmware update

Recording formats

Still photography

Video formats

References

External links 

Panasonic Lumix DMC-G3 Review – dpreview.com
Panasonic Lumix DMC-G3 Review – cameralabs.com
Panasonic Lumix DMC-G3 Review – imaging-resource.com
Panasonic Lumix DMC-G3 Review – photographyblog.com

G3